United Arab Emirates competed at the 2016 Summer Olympics in Rio de Janeiro, from 5 to 21 August 2016. This was the nation's ninth consecutive appearance at the Summer Olympics.

The United Arab Emirates National Olympic Committee selected a team of 13 athletes, 9 men and 4 women, to compete in six different sports at the Games. The nation's full roster in Rio de Janeiro was half the size of the delegation sent to London (26 athletes), and had the largest share of female athletes in its Summer Olympic history.

The Emirati roster featured five naturalized athletes: three Moldovan-born judokas Victor Scvortov, Sergiu Toma, and Ivan Remarenco, and two Ethiopian-born runners Alia Saeed Mohammed and Betlhem Desalegn. Other notable athletes on the Emirati team included skeet shooter Saeed Al-Maktoum, who competed at his fifth consecutive Games as the most experienced member, and freestyle swimmer Nada Al-Bedwawi, who was selected by the committee, as the youngest member (aged 19), to carry the Emirati flag in the opening ceremony.

United Arab Emirates left Rio de Janeiro with its first Olympic medal since double trap shooter Ahmed Al Maktoum topped the podium in Athens 2004. It was awarded to three-time judoka Toma, who took the bronze in men's half-middleweight category (81 kg).

Medalists

Athletics

Emirati athletes have so far achieved qualifying standards in the following athletics events (up to a maximum of 3 athletes in each event):

Track & road events

Cycling

Road
United Arab Emirates has qualified one rider in the men's Olympic road race by virtue of his top two individual ranking at the 2015 Asian Championships, signifying the nation's Olympic comeback to the sport for the first time since 1996.

Judo

United Arab Emirates has qualified three judokas for each of the following weight classes at the Games. Moldovan-born Victor Scvortov and London 2012 Olympian Sergiu Toma were ranked among the top 22 eligible judokas for men in the IJF World Ranking List of May 30, 2016, while Ivan Remarenco at men's half-heavyweight (100 kg) earned a continental quota spot from the Asian region, as the highest-ranked Emirati judoka outside of direct qualifying position.

Shooting

Emirati shooters have achieved quota places for the following events by virtue of their best finishes at the 2014 and 2015 ISSF World Championships, the 2015 ISSF World Cup series, and Asian Championships, as long as they obtained a minimum qualifying score (MQS) as of March 31, 2016.

Qualification Legend: Q = Qualify for the next round; q = Qualify for the bronze medal (shotgun)

Swimming

United Arab Emirates has received a Universality invitation from FINA to send two swimmers (one male and one female) to the Olympics.

Weightlifting

United Arab Emirates has received an unused quota place from IWF to send a female weightlifter to the Olympics.

See also
United Arab Emirates at the 2016 Summer Paralympics

References

External links 

 

Olympics
Nations at the 2016 Summer Olympics
2016